These are the constituencies used in the elections to the House of Keys, the lower house of the parliament of the Isle of Man.

Constituencies from 2016

Constituencies from 1986–2011

The constituencies used for the 1986, 1991, 1996, 2001, 2006 and 2011 General Elections for the House of Keys were:

1986 changes
 Garff and Ayre became one seat constituencies, having previously each had two seats.
 Onchan constituency was created, having been previously part of Middle constituency.
 Middle constituency was created from the parishes of Marown (formerly part of Glenfaba constituency) and Braddan.
 Malew and Santon constituency was created from the parishes of Malew (formerly part of Rushen constituency), and Santon (formerly part of Middle constituency).

1867 to 2011 elections
The original constituencies set out in the House of Keys Election Act 1866, providing for the House to be elected for the first time. These are shown below and were used for the 1867, 1875, and 1881 General Elections.

The arrangements for elections between 1881 and 1903 are not currently shown in the table.

The original constituencies were altered by the Redistribution Act 1893 as follows:

These were used for the 1903, 1908, 1913 and 1919 General Elections. The same constituencies and distribution of seats were also used for the 1934, 1946 and 1951 elections and so are likely also to have been used for the 1924 and 1929 elections.

The distribution of seats was changed for the 1956 election, and again for the 1986 election, as shown.

(s) = sheading, (t) = town

Further back in history, before democratic elections, each of the six sheadings was represented by four members.

References

External links
Constituency maps and general election results 
Access to work & info of members of Tynwald

 
Tynwald